Dialog Vizz was a mobile virtual network operator service based in the United Kingdom. It was part of the Vizz Mobile group of ethnic focused MVNOs owned by QiComm. Dialog Vizz is focused on the Sri Lankan community in London.

As of January 2015, the joint venture ended its operation.

References

 

Mobile phone companies of the United Kingdom
Mobile virtual network operators